WMEQ (880 kHz) is a commercial AM radio station licensed to Menomonie, Wisconsin, and serving the Eau Claire area.  It broadcasts a Conservative Talk format and is owned by iHeartMedia, Inc.

By day, WMEQ transmits 10,000 with watts; 880 AM is a clear channel frequency reserved for Class A WCBS New York City, so at night, WMEQ must reduce power to 210 watts.  It uses a directional antenna with a four-tower array to protect WCBS from interference at night.  Programming is also heard on a 130 watt FM translator in Eau Claire, W292EG at 106.3 MHz.

Programming
Weekdays on WMEQ begin with two nationally syndicated Westwood One news magazine shows, "First Light with Michael Toscano" and "America in the Morning with John Trout."  The rest of the schedule is mostly conservative talk shows from co-owned Premiere Networks:  Glenn Beck, Clay Travis and Buck Sexton, Sean Hannity, Jesse Kelly, "Ground Zero with Clyde Lewis" and "Coast to Coast AM with George Noory."

Weekends feature shows on money, health, the outdoors, gardening, technology, home repair and the law.  Weekend syndicated shows include "In the Garden with Ron Wilson," "At Home with Gary Sullivan," "Leo Laporte, the Tech Guy," "Bill Handel on the Law," "Live on Sunday Night, it's Bill Cunningham" and "Somewhere in Time with Art Bell."  Most hours begin with world and national news from Fox News Radio.

History
In , the station signed on the air.  The original call sign was WMNE.  It was a daytimer, broadcasting with 1,000 watts on 1360 kHz, but was required to go off the air at night.

It changed its call letters to WMEQ in 1989, when it also switched its dial position to 880 kHz.  The new frequency allowed the station to broadcast at 5,000 watts by day, increasing its coverage area.

References

External links

MEQ (AM)
News and talk radio stations in the United States
Radio stations established in 1953
IHeartMedia radio stations